Blue Flame is a rocket-powered land speed racing vehicle that was driven by Gary Gabelich and achieved a world land speed record on Bonneville Salt Flats in Utah on October 23, 1970. Blue Flame's world records have since been broken.

Design and construction
Blue Flame was constructed in Milwaukee, Wisconsin by Reaction Dynamics, a company formed by Pete Farnsworth, Ray Dausman and Dick Keller, who had developed the first hydrogen peroxide rocket dragster,  called the X-1 and driven by Chuck Suba.  The car used a combination of high-test peroxide and liquified natural gas (LNG), pressurized by helium gas. The effort was sponsored by the American Gas Association, with technical assistance from the Institute of Gas Technology of Des Plaines, IL.  

The engine was designed by Reaction Dynamics and some of the components were manufactured by Galaxy Manufacturing  of Tonawanda, New York.

Blue Flames engine is a regeneratively cooled variable thrust liquid-propellent engine.  It can operate on either a single- or dual-propellant basis. In operation, it permits natural gas use as a liquid, gas, or both with a two-stage combustion start.  The oxidizer flow is established first, then LNG enters a heat exchanger where it vaporizes and is brought to combustion temperature. The gas is then injected into the combustion chamber with the oxygen provided by the hydrogen peroxide.  A stable flame front is established and the remaining liquified natural gas (LNG) is injected to bring the engine to full power. 

Reaction Dynamics subsequently modified the LNG flow in the two-stage injector system to almost halve the maximum thrust. Blue Flames record runs involved accelerating continuously to the mile midpoint, then coasting through the mile. The kilometer speed trap was biased towards one end of the mile, resulting in the  higher speed.

Blue Flame uses an aluminum semi-monocoque with welded tubular structure in the nose section and an aluminum "skin."

Land speed record 

Legacy 
Blue Flame is now on permanent exhibition at the Auto and Technik Museum Sinsheim in Germany.

See also
 Rocket car

References

External links
 Break the Record - Official Blue Flame LSR video 
 Speedquest - The Blue Flame movie from Dick Keller's personal collection that he released into the public domain in 2011

Further reading 

 

Rocket land speed record cars

Streamliner cars